The Battle of Santa Ana was a battle between the Luso-Brazilian forces under the command of Alexandre Queirós in Rio Grande do Sul, modern-day Brazil.
After the Luso-Brazilian attack, oriental leader José Gervasio Artigas attempted to take the battle to the invading forces by invading Brazil. The battle lasted for 3 hours and ended with a Luso-Brazilian defeat.

References

Santa Ana 1816
Santa Ana 1816
Santa Ana 1816
1816 in Portugal
1816 in Brazil
1816 in Uruguay